Vischer Ferry Historic District is a historic district in Saratoga County, New York.  It was listed on the National Register of Historic Places in 1975 and its boundaries were increased in 1997. The district, located along the Erie Canal, contains several historic structures within the hamlet of Vischer Ferry. These include the Nicholas and Eldret Vischer House, dating from the mid-1700s.

It was listed on the National Register of Historic Places in 1975, with a boundary increase in 1997.

References

External links
 Lakes to Locks Passage:Vischer Ferry Historic District

Gallery

Historic districts on the National Register of Historic Places in New York (state)
Federal architecture in New York (state)
Buildings and structures in Saratoga County, New York
National Register of Historic Places in Saratoga County, New York
Tourist attractions in Saratoga County, New York